Muspiceida is an order of nematodes belonging to the class Enoplea.

Families:
 Muspiceidae Brumpt, 1920
 Robertdollfusiidae Chabaud & Campana, 1950

References

Nematode orders
Enoplea